Farah Ossouli (born 10 August 1953 in Zanjan, Iran) is an Iranian painter, based in Tehran. She is known for her modern interpretation of Persian miniature. Often her work draws on issues related to women's life, Persian poetry, and classical western art.

Biography 
Ossouli graduated in 1971 from Girl's School of Fine Arts, Tehran. Ossouli graduated in 1977 with a B.A. degree in graphic design from University of Tehran. In 1975, Ossouli married Khosrow Sinai.

Her work is often created in gouache and watercolor and features subjects found in Persian miniature painting set in contemporary themes, subjects may include women, men, grapes, birds, flowers, grapes, among other things. Her work replaced the text often found in traditional miniature painting with blocks of color and the scale of the figures is manipulated.

She has chaired the 6th Tehran Contemporary Painting Biennial, held in 2003.

Her work has been collected in many public art collections including, the Metropolitan Museum of Art, Art Gallery of Western Australia, Tehran Museum of Contemporary Art, Los Angeles County Museum of Art, among others. She has held solo exhibitions in the United States, Europe, Iran, and participated in group exhibition in many other countries.

References

External links 
 
Interview: What Came From Her Heart Taught Us Her Art - Farah Ossouli (2016) from Tehran Times

1953 births
Living people
20th-century Iranian women artists
21st-century Iranian women artists
People from Zanjan, Iran
Iranian women painters
University of Tehran alumni